The Egg of Columbus (Ei des Columbus in German) is a puzzle consisting of a flat egg-like shape divided into 9 or 10 pieces by straight cuts.  The goal of the puzzle is to rearrange the pieces so as to form other specific shapes, as in a tangram.  

The earliest known examples were produced by Richter, a German toy manufacturer.  Production ceased in 1963, but restarted near the start of the 21st century.

Because the two pieces coloured turquoise in these diagrams lack bilateral symmetry, some shapes in which both pieces have the same chirality, as in two of the examples below, require one of them to be flipped over.

See also
 Egg of Columbus

References

External links
Egg of Columbus on the manufacturer's website
Tangram game player (free software) with the egg of Columbus puzzle
MathLove Puzzle : The Magic Egg — How to make the Puzzle (describes the geometry of the puzzle)
Tangram Circle Puzzle similar to Egg of Columbus but with added challenge of matching color spots

Mechanical puzzles